Hootan Dolati (born 4 February 1977 in Tehran, Iran) is a political activist and member of the Iran's National Front. He was in Evin Prison for a year and a half.

Biography
Prior to his arrest by the Iranian government Dolati worked as an engineer and as a journalist. He was one of the founders of the Green Peace affiliate in Iran.

Imprisonment
On March 15, 2013 Dolati was arrested on the charges of "Propaganda Against the State" and "Membership in a Banned Group". His sentence was one and a half years in prison, and a five-year ban on membership in any political party or social group.

Dolati has been repeatedly denied medical treatment by the clinic in Tehran's Evin Prison. He has been on hunger strike since 28 November 2013, in protest at being denied medical care for his chronic heart condition.

Dolati was released on 6 September 2014.

See also
 Human rights in Iran
 National Front (Iran)

References

External links
 Shanhoseni by Hootan Dolati

Iranian people of Talysh descent
1977 births
Iranian civil engineers
National Front (Iran) politicians
Iranian prisoners and detainees
Iranian democracy activists
Hunger strikers
Living people
Iranian dissidents
Iranian Sunni Muslims
Talysh people